Thomas William Fitzsimmons (April 6, 1890 – December 20, 1971), was a professional baseball player who played third base in four games for the Brooklyn Robins during the 1919 baseball season. He was born in Oakland, California, and attended Saint Mary's College of California.

External links

1890 births
1971 deaths
Major League Baseball third basemen
Brooklyn Robins players
Baseball players from Oakland, California
Saint Mary's Gaels baseball coaches
Saint Mary's Gaels baseball players
Oakland Commuters players
Vernon Tigers players
Spokane Indians players
Wichita Witches players
Vancouver Beavers players
Butte Miners players
Jersey City Skeeters players
Oakland Oaks (baseball) players